Boyne City is a city in Charlevoix County in the U.S. state of Michigan.  The population was 3,816 at the 2020 census.  The city is located at the southeastern end of Lake Charlevoix where Boyne River drains into the lake.

History
The area was first settled as early as 1856 by the families of John Dixon and John Miller in 1856, which was part of Emmet County until Charlevoix County was organized in 1869.  Miller first named the settlement Boyne, as it was near the already-named Boyne River, which derived its name from a river in Ireland.  A post office named Boyne opened on September 29, 1869 with Miller serving as the first postmaster.  Others moved to the area with the opening of the Pine Lake House by A. J. Hall in 1879.  The community incorporated as a village in 1885 and was renamed Boyne City in 1904.  It incorporated as a city in 1907.

Boyne City was home to the Buelah Home, which was built by Herman Swift in 1902.  It served as a housing facility for delinquent boys.  By 1910, the Buelah Home housed approximately 200 boys, who were also reviled by the community for committing numerous crimes and causing mischief.  Soon after, Swift was accused of molesting numerous boys under his care, and criminal charges were filed.  It became a cause célèbre in northern Michigan, and it made headlines throughout the country.  Many boys who accused Swift of the charges dropped out of the lawsuit to avoid public scrutiny. The case dragged on for three years before eventually making its way to the Michigan Supreme Court under chief justice Joseph H. Steere.  Swift was acquitted, but it led to the Buelah Home being closed in 1912 and demolished in 1920.

The city contains three listings on the National Register of Historic Places.  The downtown area along Lake Street and Water Street has been included into the Boyne City Central Historic District.  The municipal Boyne City Water Works Building was constructed in 1910 when the city was experiencing a tremendous growth in population, and the building continues to serve its purpose as a city water system booster station.  The Chicago and West Michigan Railroad Charlevoix Station was built in 1892 as a station along the Chicago and Michigan Lake Shore Railroad, and it now serves as a museum and rental hall.

Geography

The principal geographic feature of the city is Lake Charlevoix.  The Boyne River also flows through this city into Lake Charlevoix.  Young State Park is just northwest of the city limits in Evangeline Township.

Climate
This climatic region has large seasonal temperature differences, with warm to hot (and often humid) summers and cold (sometimes severely cold) winters.  According to the Köppen Climate Classification system,  Boyne City has a humid continental climate, abbreviated "Dfb" on climate maps.

Transportation

Major highways
  curves and runs through the city.
  is a county-designated highway that runs through the north portion of the city before terminating M-75.
  is a county-designated highway that enters the city briefly from the south and terminates at M-75.

Airport
 Boyne City Municipal Airport is a public use airport located in the city limits.

Railroad
 Boyne City Railroad was a railway company based in Boyne City from 1893–1978.  Boyne City once contained its own train station along the larger Boyne City, Gaylord & Alpena Railroad.

Demographics

2010 census
 census, there were 3,735 people, 1,635 households, and 1,011 families living in the city. The racial makeup of the city was 94.9% White, 0.4% African American, 0.7% Native American, 0.5% Asian, 0.1% Pacific Islander, 0.3% from other races, and 3.2% from two or more races. Hispanic or Latino of any race were 1.3% of the population.

There were 1,635 households, of which 29.8% had children under the age of 18 living with them, 43.8% were married couples living together, 13.1% had a female householder with no husband present, 4.9% had a male householder with no wife present, and 38.2% were non-families. 33.4% of all households were made up of individuals, and 14.8% had someone living alone who was 65 years of age or older. The average household size was 2.27 and the average family size was 2.85.

The median age in the city was 41.9 years. 23.9% of residents were under the age of 18; 7.5% were between the ages of 18 and 24; 22.6% were from 25 to 44; 29% were from 45 to 64; and 16.9% were 65 years of age or older. The gender makeup of the city was 48.5% male and 51.5% female.

2000 census
 census, there were 3,503 people, 1,468 households, and 932 families living in the city. The racial makeup of the city was 96.92% White, 0.11% African American, 1.14% Native American, 0.17% Asian, 0.06% Pacific Islander, 0.40% from other races, and 1.20% from two or more races. Hispanic or Latino of any race were 0.74% of the population.

There were 1,468 households, out of which 31.5% had children under the age of 18 living with them, 49.6% were married couples living together, 10.7% had a female householder with no husband present, and 36.5% were non-families. 31.7% of all households were made up of individuals, and 15.0% had someone living alone who was 65 years of age or older.  The average household size was 2.38 and the average family size was 3.01.

In the city, the population was spread out, with 26.4% under the age of 18, 7.4% from 18 to 24, 28.5% from 25 to 44, 22.0% from 45 to 64, and 15.8% who were 65 years of age or older.  The median age was 38 years. For every 100 females, there were 95.4 males.  For every 100 females aged 18 and over, there were 90.6 males.

The median income for a household in the city was $35,819, and the median income for a family was $44,096. Males had a median income of $29,558 versus $22,583 for females. The per capita income for the city was $19,030.  About 8.9% of families and 11.8% of the population were below the poverty line, including 18.2% of those under age 18 and 6.7% of those aged 65 or over.

Culture

Events
Boyne City hosts the National Morel Mushroom Festival annually in May.

Sports
Boyne City Boosters were a minor league baseball team that was part of the Michigan State League from 1911–1914.

Education
Boyne City is served entirely by its own school district, Boyne City Public Schools, which serves the city and large portions of several neighboring townships.

Notable people
Charles Archibald Nichols, state politician who served in the U.S. House of Representatives, born in Boyne City
John William Tebbel, journalist, editor, writer, teacher, and media historian who was born in Boyne City.

References

External links
Boyne City official website
Boyne Area Chamber Website

Cities in Charlevoix County, Michigan
Populated places established in 1856
1856 establishments in Michigan